The 1997–98 Kazakhstan Cup is the sixth season of the Kazakhstan Cup, the annual nationwide football cup competition of Kazakhstan since the independence of the country. The competition begins on 15 June 1997, and will end with the final in June 1998. Kairat are the defending champions, having won their second cup in the 1996-97 competition.

First round

Quarter-finals

Semi-finals

Final

References

Kazakhstan Cup seasons
1998 domestic association football cups
Cup